The Outdoor Labour Test Order was a piece of policy issued by the Poor Law Commission on 13 April 1842 which allowed the use of outdoor relief to the able-bodied poor. The order was issued after there was some opposition to the Commission's previous order stating that only indoor relief should be used. During times when the manufacturing industries were performing poorly this became impractical - however the Poor Law Amendment Act 1834 had aimed to prevent the use of outdoor relief and replace it with indoor relief.

See also
Outdoor Relief Prohibitory Order
From the handwritten minutes of the Warrington Board of Guardians, accessed at Preston Archive service 27 March 2012
6 September 1859.
Mr Manwaring, Visitor on behalf of the Poor Law Board, had reported that:
‘In consequence of the distance from town which the office where the outdoor paupers are relieved is situated the relief of those aged and infirm paupers who cannot on account of their infirmities attend to receive it is transmitted to them through other paupers who deduct a trifling sum for their trouble.’
my notesThe Poor Law Board write to quote this and tell the Warrington Board of Guardians that they should situate the relieving office to the centre of town so that these infirm paupers can collect their own money.
The Guardians’ relieving officer reported to them (on 13 September) that the number of persons who would benefit from an office in the Town Centre was ‘only thirteen’. The Warrington Board of Guardians decided to write to the Poor Law Board saying there will be no alteration in the method of paying relief.

External links
Workhouse.org's article on the order

Poor Law in Britain and Ireland
1842 in the United Kingdom